William Rhys Powell (3 August 1948 – 23 March 2022) was a British Conservative politician.  A barrister, he was MP for Corby from 1983 to 1997, when he lost the seat to Labour's Phil Hope. Born in Crickhowell, Wales, he was educated at Lancing College and Emmanuel College, Cambridge.

Powell died on 23 March 2022, at the age of 73.

References

 "Times Guide to the House of Commons", Times Newspapers Limited, 1997 edition

External links 
 

1948 births
2022 deaths
Conservative Party (UK) MPs for English constituencies
UK MPs 1983–1987
UK MPs 1987–1992
UK MPs 1992–1997
People educated at Lancing College
Alumni of Emmanuel College, Cambridge
British barristers
People from Crickhowell